The Northwest Youth League was a right-wing, anti-communist South Korean paramilitary group active during the Cold War. It is most well known for committing widespread atrocities during the South Korean government-led suppression of the Jeju Uprising.

History
The Northwest Youth League was established in November 30, 1946 by refugees escaping Soviet-occupied North Korea. Murals in the Jeju April 3 Peace Park Museum state that Northwest Youth League members fought Soviets and Korean communists because “members of their family had been imprisoned, raped or murdered in North Korea, and that their property had been confiscated.”

The league conducted vigilante justice against suspected communists with no legal basis. The league was supported by Syngman Rhee, the ardent, anti-communist, US-backed autocrat of South Korea. A socialist uprising in Jeju occurred from 1948 to 1949, followed by a violent suppression campaign. According to Bruce Cumings, the league was brutal towards the residents of Jeju Island, exercising more authority than the police. Between 14,000 and 30,000 people were killed during the Jeju uprising. 86% by security forces and paramilitary groups including the Northwest Youth League, and 14% by rebels. Survivors give accounts of torture used against children and mass murder. This created deep resentment in Jeju residents. What began as an anti-communist movement, quickly became a force to crush anyone who opposed President Rhee and the Korea Democratic Party.

A decade after the Korean War, Rhee was forced into exile after the April Revolution in South Korea. Anti-communism remained a powerful force, especially during the dictatorships of Park Chung-hee and Chun Doo-Hwan.

References 

Far-right politics in South Korea
Anti-communism in South Korea
Anti-communist terrorism
Anti-North Korean sentiment in South Korea
Paramilitary organizations based in Korea
Korean War
1946 establishments in Korea